Goodbye Terrible Youth is the second studio album by the indie rock band American Wrestlers, released on November 4, 2016 on Fat Possum Records.

Critical reception

Goodbye Terrible Youth received favourable reviews upon its release. At Metacritic, which assigns a normalized rating out of 100 to reviews from mainstream critics, the album has received an average score of 77, based on 9 reviews, indicating "generally favorable reviews".

Praising the album's improved production values, in comparison to its home-recorded predecessor, American Wrestlers, and the participation of the full band, Allmusic's Marcy Donelson wrote: [Goodbye Terrible Youth] also exhibits a sleeker sound than the notably rough-hewn debut, with McClure having invested in "a laptop and some decent microphones." Thankfully, these changes don't erode the outfit's free-spirited charisma. If anything, the effect here is more similar to moving from a live recording to the studio than into something that's watered down or compromised."

In a positive review for Pitchfork, Brian Burlage wrote, "The album is a significant improvement for a band that’s still coming into its own, still, in other words, in its youth."

Track listing

Personnel
Bridgette Imperial – keyboards
Gary McClure – guitar, vocals
Ian Reitz – bass
Josh Van Hoorebeke – drums

References

2016 albums
American Wrestlers albums
Fat Possum Records albums